Ardross may refer to:

 Ardross, Western Australia
 Ardross, Highland, Scotland
 Ardross (horse), Thoroughbred race horse
 , a Hong Kong steamship in service 1961-63

See also 
 Ardross Castle (disambiguation)